The 2016–17 Moldovan National Division is the 26th season of top-tier football in Moldova. The competition began on 23 July 2016 and ended in May 2017.

Stadia and locations

Personnel and sponsorship

Managerial changes

League table

Gold Match
Since Dacia Chișinău and Sheriff Tiraspol finished level on points at the end of the season, a "Gold Match" was played to decide the title. The "home" team (for administrative purposes) was determined by an additional draw held on 23 May 2017.

Results
The schedule consists of three rounds. During the first two rounds, each team plays each other once home-and-away for a total of 20 matches. The pairings of the third round will then be set according to the standings after the first two rounds, giving every team a third game against each opponent for a total of 30 games per team.

First and second round

Third round

Top goalscorers

Hat-tricks

Top assists

Clean sheets

Disciplinary
Updated to matches played on 13 June 2017.

References

External links
 Official website
 uefa.com

National Division 2016-17
Moldovan Super Liga seasons
Moldova 1